Mendeleyevo is an urban locality (a work settlement) in Solnechnogorsky District of Moscow Oblast, Russia, which stands on the Klyazma River, about  from its source, near the city of Zelenograd, and opposite of the ancient Russian village of Lyalovo. Population: 

It was founded in 1957 as a closed town attached to the All-Union (now All-Russian) Scientific Research Institute for Physical-Engineering and Radiotechnical Metrology (VNIIFTRI), and is named after the famous Russian chemist Dmitry Mendeleyev who was an eminent metrologist as well. While not now officially in the list of Russian naukograds, it is still close to this category, as the VNIIFTRI scientific institute remains one of the most important local employers. Aeroflot Flight 411 crashed near the town in July 1982.

References

External links
Official website of Mendeleyevo 
Official website of VNIIFTRI 

Urban-type settlements in Moscow Oblast